Sir James Anderson (1824–1893) captained SS Great Eastern on the laying of the Transatlantic telegraph cable in 1865 and 1866.

Anderson was born in Dumfries in south west Scotland and educated at the academy there.

Anderson captained Great Eastern, designed by Isambard Kingdom Brunel, on the transatlantic telegraph cable laying voyages of 1865 and 1866. He was later managing director of the Eastern Telegraph Company, which became the largest submarine cable firm in the world.

References 

Sea captains
People from Dumfries
People educated at Dumfries Academy
1824 births
1893 deaths